Reyer Venezia is a women's basketball club based in Venice, Italy. The team plays in the LBF, the highest level in Italian basketball. The team was successful in the 1930s and 1950s and won two Italian title in 1946 and 2021.

Honours
Serie A1
Champions (2): 1945–46, 2020–21
Serie A2
Champions (1): 2012–13
Italian Cup
Champions (1): 2008

In European competition
Source: basketball.eurobasket.com
Participations in EuroLeague: 3x
Participations in EuroCup: 11x
Participations in Adriatic League: 1x

 Due to the COVID-19 pandemic in Northern Italy, TTT Riga didn't travel to Venezia and automaticly lost the game by 20–0.

Sport in Venice
Women's basketball teams in Italy